Events from the year 1358 in Ireland.

Incumbent
Lord: Edward III

Events
 On the petition of the Irish clergy, King Edward III established a chair of theology in the Medieval University of Dublin

Deaths
 Maurice FitzGerald, 2nd Earl of Desmond